Udit Narayan has won four National Film Awards and five Filmfare Awards. In 2001, Narayan was awarded the Prabal Gorkha Dakshin Bahu by the late King of Nepal Birendra Bir Bikram Shah Dev. In 2009, Udit Narayan was awarded the Padma Shri and in 2016 he was awarded with the Padma Bhushan by the Government of India.

Awards and nominations

Honours
 2001 - Gorkha Dakshina Bahu
 2009 - Padma Shri
 2016 - Padma Bhushan

References

Lists of awards received by Indian musician